Body and Soul is the first solo studio album by New Zealand singer Jenny Morris, released in July 1987 by Warner Music Group. The album peaked at number 13 in Australia and 21 in New Zealand.

At the ARIA Music Awards of 1988, the album won ARIA Award for Best Female Artist.

Track listing

Personnel 

 Bruce Allen – horn
 Gary Beers – bass
 Ian Belton – bass
 John Bliss – drums
 Mike Bukovsky – horn
 Dave Dobbyn – backing vocals
 Andrew Farriss – guitar, keyboards, producer
 Ricky Fataar – drums
 Tim Finn – piano, vocals
 Wayne Goodwin – fiddle
 James Greening – horn
 Maggie McKinney – backing vocals
 Sam McNally – keyboards
 Mark Moffatt – electric and 12-string guitar, producer
 Jenny Morris – vocals, backing vocals
 Ian Moss – guitar, backing vocals
 Mark Meyer – drums
 Paul Panichi – trumpet
 Barton Price – drums
 Mark Punch – guitar, harmonica, backing vocals
 Andrew Reefman – drums
 Phil Small – bass
 Andrew Thompson – saxophone
 Amanda Vincent – organ, keyboards
 Mark Williams – backing vocals

Charts

Certifications

References

1987 debut albums
ARIA Award-winning albums
Warner Music Group albums
Jenny Morris (musician) albums